Dibo may refer to:

People
 Dibo Johnson (1890–1940), American baseball player
 Dibo Thomas-Babyngton Elango
 Sob Evariste Dibo (born 1968), Ivorian football player
 , Austrian athlete

Places
 Termessadou-Dibo, Guinea

Other
 Dibo language
 Dibo people